KPC may refer to:
 kiloparsec (kpc), a unit of measurement used in astronomy
 Kaltim Prima Coal, a thermal coal mine in Kalimantan Timur, Indonesia
 Kampala Pentecostal Church, an English speaking church in downtown Kampala, Uganda
 King's Privy Council for Canada, an advisory body to the monarch of Canada
 Kenai Peninsula College, a college with three campuses on the Kenai Peninsula in Alaska
 Key purchasing criteria, a business term defining factors that contribute to a consumer's buying decision
 KPC Media Group, a media company based in Kendallville, Indiana
 Kenya Pipeline Company, a state corporation of Kenya
 Kiribati Protestant Church, the former name of the Kiribati Uniting Church, the second-largest religious group in Kiribati
 Klebsiella pneumoniae carbapenemase, the gene for an enzyme produced by some highly antibiotic-resistant bacteria
 Kosovo Protection Corps
 Kuwait Petroleum Corporation, an umbrella company which takes control of all petroleum and oil-related aspects of Kuwait
 Kunzang Palyul Choling, a Tibetan Buddhist organization headed by Jetsunma Ahkon Lhamo